The Belgian Albums Chart, divided into the two main regions Flanders and Wallonia, ranks the best-performing albums in Belgium, as compiled by Ultratop.

Flanders

Wallonia

References

Number one albums
Belgium Albums
Belgian record charts